New Mexico Military Institute (NMMI) is a public military junior college and high school in Roswell, New Mexico. Founded in 1891, NMMI operates under the auspices of the State of New Mexico, under a dedicated Board of Regents that reports to the Governor of New Mexico. Located in downtown Roswell, NMMI enrolls nearly 1,000 cadets at the junior college and high school levels each year. NMMI is the only state-supported military college located in the western United States and has many notable alumni who have served at senior levels in the military and private sector.

Academic school years at NMMI usually begin with nearly 1,000 cadets enrolled, with slight attrition occurring during the school year due to demanding academic and physical requirements. The school's two-year Army ROTC Early Commissioning Program (ECP) commissions approximately 30 cadets annually as U.S. Army second lieutenants, and almost 100 cadets each year go to one of the five United States Service academies.

NMMI's motto is "Duty, Honor, and Achievement". The Cadet Honor Code, which was unanimously voted into place by the Corps of Cadets in 1921, states, "A Cadet Will Not Lie, Cheat, or Steal, Nor Tolerate Those Who Do" and is administered by an honor board of cadets, advised by cadre and staff.  The school's athletic teams are the Broncos (junior college) and the Colts (high school), and its colors are scarlet and black.

History

New Mexico Military Institute was founded by Colonel Robert S. Goss and Captain Joseph C. Lea in 1891, originally as the Goss Military Institute, with an initial enrollment of 38 students. It was recognized by the territorial legislature and renamed NMMI in 1893. While the legislature had recognized the school, it failed to provide funding, and the school was forced to close its doors on "Bad Friday", March 29, 1895. In the winter of 1894–1895 a funding bill was prepared and approved by the legislature. James J. Hagerman donated a  tract of land which became the current location of the institute. The school reopened in the fall of 1898.

Hundreds of graduates served in World War I and World War II, including Medal of Honor recipient John C. Morgan and hotelier Conrad Hilton of the Hilton Hotels chain.

In 1948, the institute introduced a four-year liberal arts college program but discontinued it in 1956.

The school became fully coeducational in 1977, although some females had attended as non-cadet day students from 1891 to 1898.

The current superintendent, Major General (retired) Jerry W. Grizzle, was appointed in 2009.

In 2013, the institute broke off relations with the alumni association over disagreement about finances. Members of the alumni association claimed that this was an effort by the school to gain access and control of the over $5.2 million in assets of the association. On June 10, 2013, the school filed a lawsuit in Chaves County to take control of the assets of the alumni association. Editorial response to the institute's actions has been generally negative, calling it a "hijacking" of the group and its resources. On April 21, 2015, the Fifth Judicial District Court found that the alumni association had not breached its agreement with NMMI and that NMMI had "improperly terminated" the agreement. The judge required the association to turn over the funds.

Campus

The original area of land for the campus was donated to the school by local rancher James J. Hagerman, for whom the main barracks complex is named. The institute's buildings are made in a uniform Gothic Revival style out of buff brick. Its architecture and organization was inspired by the Virginia Military Institute. The campus is a designated area on the National Register of Historic Places.

Cadet life
Cadets are organized into a Corps of Cadets, following the organization of a cavalry regiment with a Headquarters Troop that comprises the Marching Band. The regiment comprises three squadrons consisting of four to five troops each. Cadets are structured into classes, 6th Class (9th grade high school equivalent) through 1st Class (college sophomore). Cadets are all treated on the basis of earned merit. The military boarding school environment is maintained by the cadet leadership, with all academic classes, meals, and military and physical training occurring "on post" (on campus) in a controlled environment. Based on the rank structure of the Virginia Military Institute, cadets start out as New Cadets, also known as RATs (recruits at training). College and high school cadets are RATs for one semester, then the next semester are known as yearlings, and after the one year mark they are called Old Cadets. Cadets also earn Junior or Senior Army ROTC positions outside of the Corps, although starting in the Fall of 2022 school year, JROTC ranks and Corps ranks will be integrated. College and High School were separated in the Corps and in two different barracks starting in the fall of 2022 as well, except at the regimental staff level. These factors determine a cadet's privileges and authority and define social interactions at the institute.

The rules of the institute for cadets are codified in the "Blue Book".

Rules are enforced using a system of tours and demerits detailed in the Blue Book, as well as on-the-spot correction. Minor offenses may result in simply correction of behavior or disciplinary measures like physical activity, often push-ups. A tour is simply one full hour of marching in uniform with a rifle. Cadets with excessive demerits may be put on disciplinary probation, in which many of their privileges are taken away. Similarly, cadets who fail to meet standards of academic performance are put on academic probation, in which their privileges are largely revoked. There is also Honor probation administered by the NMMI Honor Board for offenses related to violations of the NMMI Honor Code. Punishment at the institute is strict and quickly administered by the cadre and staff of the institute when regulations are not followed. Leaving post is generally only authorized on weekends, holidays and during family visits.

All cadets live "on-post" (on-campus) in one of the two barracks. Services provided for Cadets include housing, the Mail Room, a Barber Shop (free to cadets), the PX restaurant, Bates Dining Facility, Reveille Coffee Shop, Game Room, Cadet Store, Laundry and Dry-Cleaning service, self-serve laundromat, Tailors, chapel services, infirmary, and cadet counseling center. There is also a bowling alley, but it is currently under renovation.

The Commandant and Dean of Students is COL Thomas Tate, who leads a group of staff that advises the leaders in the corps of cadets, and is responsible for cadet life at the Institute.

Athletics
The football team, the Broncos, competes in the Southwest Junior College Football Conference with six Texas schools and one Oklahoma school. They are coached by head coach Kurt Taufa'asau, a former NFL pro, alumnus of the Institute, and the Bronco Team. He won the American Community College Football Coaches Association Coach of the Year in addition to NJCAA Coach of the Year and SWJCFC Coach of the Year. They won the 2021 NJCAA National football championship game, which was broadcast nationwide on CBS. Its other sports compete in the Western Junior College Athletic Conference. Their women's college volleyball team, coached by Shelby Fortchner, also competes in the NJCAA and were national runner-ups in the 2021-2022 season. They also have college golf, tennis, cross country, baseball and basketball teams at the NJCAA level, that compete under the Bronco name. 

Their High School sports mascot is the Colts, and they compete in various divisions and districts in the NMAA (New Mexico Activities Association), including football, soccer, volleyball, tennis, swimming and diving, golf, basketball, baseball, cross country, and track and field competing with other New Mexico High Schools in the region.

Athletic facilities include: The newly renovated Cahoon Armory, Stapp Parade Field/Soccer Field, Godfrey Athletic Center, NMMI Ballpark, NMMI Football Field, Gene Hardman Memorial Tennis Courts, the NMMI Golf Course, the Outdoor Fitness Factory, and the Sports Medicine Facility.

 

The Athletic Director since July 2014 is NMMI COL Jose Barron. He was named the NJCAA Athletic Director of the Year in April 2022.

Notable alumni
Link Abrams, professional basketball player
Wilson Alvarez, professional football player
Bobby Baldock, United States federal appellate judge (Tenth Circuit Court of Appeals)
Ernst Bertner, first president of the Texas Medical Center
Norman E. Brinker, founder of Brinker International
Matt Coates, professional football player
Charles A. Coulombe, writer and historian
William "Billy Jack" Cox, public interest attorney, author and political activist
Bill Daniels, cable television pioneer
Carlo D'Este, U.S. Army lieutenant colonel, military historian
Sam Donaldson, news anchor for ABC News
Julian Ewell, U.S. Army lieutenant general
Taylor Force, soldier after whom the Taylor Force Act was named
William J. Gray, New Mexico House of Representatives member, Senior Vice President of Navajo Refining Company and Holly Corporation
Conrad Hamilton, professional football player
Ira B. Harkey Jr., awarded the 1963 Pulitzer Prize for Editorial Writing
Joe Hernandez, professional football player
Conrad Hilton, founder of the Hilton Hotel chain
Conrad Hilton Jr., socialite
Paul Horgan, two-time Pulitzer Prize-winning author
Peter Hurd, artist, painted the presidential portrait of Lyndon B. Johnson
Jessica Jaymes, pornographic actress
Victor Lownes, Playboy Clubs executive
John C. Morgan, pilot and Medal of Honor recipient of World War II
Greg Morris, professional football player
Hal Mumme, collegiate football coach
Pat O'Rourke, politician
Guillermo Padrés Elías, governor of Sonora, Mexico
Anthony Principi, fourth United States Secretary of Veterans Affairs
Bill Purifoy, professional football player
Chuck Roberts, news anchor for CNN Headline News
Dave Sherer, professional football player
Blair Smith, professional football player
Joe Smith, professional football player
Roger Staubach, professional football player, member of the Pro Football Hall of Fame
G. Harry Stine, sci-fi writer, model rocketry pioneer
Casey Urlacher, professional football player, brother of Brian Urlacher
Tim Van Galder, professional football player
Edwin Walker, U.S. Army major general
Frank D. White, governor of Arkansas
Owen Wilson, actor

See also
New Mexico Military Institute Summer Camp, Main Building, in Lincoln County, New Mexico
National Register of Historic Places listings in Chaves County, New Mexico

References

External links 

 

Military education and training in the United States
Public universities and colleges in New Mexico
United States military junior colleges
Roswell, New Mexico
Schools in Chaves County, New Mexico
Military high schools in the United States
Public high schools in New Mexico
Educational institutions established in 1891
1891 establishments in New Mexico Territory
National Register of Historic Places in Chaves County, New Mexico
NJCAA athletics
University and college buildings on the National Register of Historic Places in New Mexico
Historic districts on the National Register of Historic Places in New Mexico